The City and Regional Magazine Association (CRMA) is an American nonprofit organization founded in 1978 that facilitates professional development and training for member magazines and methods for exchanging information and ideas.

Activities 
The Association organizes activities to encourage editorial and journalistic standards, and compile industry research and data for its members. CRMA also represents member magazines on major national and regional public policy issues. The organization's membership comprises publications from the United States, Canada and Mexico. Each year, the organization provides awards for excellence to qualified member organizations in designated categories. The awards are managed on CRMA’s behalf by the University of Missouri School of Journalism.

Members 
The Association's members are primarily publications focused on general interest topics covering a local or regional area and distributed through the mail or through newsstand sales. Members must have, or be in the process of completing, circulation audits.

Existing members include:

Services 
Services offered by CRMA to its members include:
 Financial standards and performance surveys with customized comparisons
 An advertising sales network allowing members to market their advertising in multiple markets
 Email lists serving each of the major departments of their member's publications which allows colleagues to remain in contact
 A national conference for staff organized based on departments and tasks which generally spans 3 days and provides educational sessions on operations and an exhibit show for vendors
 Two publishers roundtable meetings each year where management topics and concerns are discussed by executive level participants

References 

1978 establishments in the United States
Organizations established in 1978
Non-profit organizations based in California
American journalism organizations
Professional associations based in the United States